Rizvan Chitigov (Amerikanets, Marine, 22 April 1964 – 23 March 2005) was a prominent Chechen rebel field commander in Shalinsky District of the Chechen Republic (Russia) until his death on 23 March 2005.

In the early 1990s, Chitigov lived the United States. Upon his return to Chechnya, he oversaw military intelligence in the Chechen separatist government of Aslan Maskhadov. The Russian FSB suspected that Chitigov had been maintaining ties with foreign intelligence services and was himself a CIA agent.

Chitigov was killed on 23 March 2005 in Chechnya in the Shali district center. According to the Russian state agency RIA Novosti, Chitigov previously served in the Confederation of Mountain Peoples of the Caucasus and was "planning to use chemical and bacteriological weapons against federal forces".

References

2005 deaths
People of the Central Intelligence Agency
Chechen field commanders
Deaths by firearm in Russia
People of the Chechen wars
Chechen warlords
1964 births
North Caucasian independence activists